Sark (Sercquiais:  or ) is a part of the Channel Islands in the southwestern English Channel, off the coast of Normandy, France. It is a royal fief, which forms part of the Bailiwick of Guernsey, with its own set of laws based on Norman law and its own parliament. It has a population of about 500. Little Sark is a peninsula joined by a natural but high and very narrow isthmus to the rest of Sark Island.

Sark is one of the few remaining places in the world where cars are banned from roads and only tractors, bicycles and horse-drawn vehicles are allowed. In 2011, Sark was designated as a Dark Sky Community and the first Dark Sky Island in the world.

Geography and geology

Protective railings were added in 1900; before then, children would crawl across on their hands and knees to avoid being blown over the edge. A narrow concrete road covering the entirety of the isthmus was built in 1945 by German prisoners of war under the direction of the Royal Engineers. Due to its isolation, the inhabitants of Little Sark had their own distinct form of Sercquiais, the native Norman dialect of the island.

A windmill, dated 1571, is found there, the sails of which were removed during World War II. This high point is named Le Moulin, after the windmill. The location is also the highest point in the Bailiwick of Guernsey. Little Sark had a number of mines accessing a source of galena. At Port Gorey, the ruins of silver mines may be seen. Off the south end of Little Sark are the Venus Pool and the Adonis Pool, both natural swimming pools whose waters are refreshed at high tide.

The whole island is extensively penetrated at sea level by natural cave formations that provide unique habitats for many marine creatures, notably sea anemones, some of which are only safely accessible at low tide.

Sark is made up mainly of amphibolite and granite gneiss rocks, intruded by igneous magma sheets called quartz diorite. Recent (1990–2000) geological studies and rock age-dating by geologists from Oxford Brookes University shows that the gneisses probably formed around 620–600 million years ago during the Late Pre-Cambrian Age Cadomian Orogeny. The quartz diorite sheets were intruded during this Cadomian deformation and metamorphic event.

All the Sark rocks (and those of the nearby Channel Islands of Guernsey and Alderney) formed during geological activity in the continental crust above an ancient subduction zone. This geological setting would have been analogous to the modern-day subduction zone of the Pacific Ocean plate colliding and subducting beneath the North and South American continental plate.

Sark also exercises jurisdiction over the island of Brecqhou, only a few hundred feet west of Greater Sark. It is a private island, but it has recently been opened to some visitors. Since 1993, Brecqhou has been owned by David and Frederick Barclay, the brothers and co-owners of The Daily Telegraph until David Barclay's death in 2021. The brothers contested Sark's control over the island. The candidates endorsed by their various business interests on the island failed to win any seats in the elections held in 2008 and 2010.

Toponymy

Old records
Sark is probably first mentioned in the Antonine Itinerary (Itinerarium Antonini Augusti, part II : itinerarium maritimum) 3rd – 4th century AD together with the other main Channel Islands as Sarnia, Caesarea, Barsa, Silia and Andium, but it is unclear to which it refers. It has been suggested that Silia referred to Sark. The earliest record to evoke possibly the name of Sark are the Life of saint Samson and the Life of saint Magloire, bishops of Dol-de-Bretagne. They spell it Sargia, with the neighbouring island Bissargia, all the other documents are from the 11th to the 12th century and the forms are : Serc, Serch, Sercum, Serco.

Etymology
Richard Coates has suggested that in the absence of a Proto-Indo-European etymology it may be worthwhile looking for a Proto-Semitic source for the name. He proposes a comparison between the probable root of Sark, *Sarg-, and Proto-Semitic *śrq "redden; rise (as of the sun); east", noting Sark's position as the easternmost island of the Guernsey group. His theory is based on the early medieval Latin records mentioning Sargia, but many Islands more or less close to Sark have a Latin name ending with -gia, such as Angia (Channel Island), Oye-Plage (Pas-de-Calais, Ogia 8th century) and Île-d'Yeu (Vendée, former Augia). Later records all mention Serc- and not *Sark, that seem to result from a later anglicising of the /er/ group (compare French merveille > English marvel; French Clerc / English clerk, clark cf. Clark). The traditional pronunciation of Sark in the native Norman language is sèr , with regular fall of final  like clerc in French. Finally, no specialist ever identified any Proto-Semitic element in the French coastal toponymy, even on the French mediterranean side. René Lepelley suggests a Scandinavian etymology that would explain the regular and late records of the root Serc- in the documents, according to him, it could be Old Norse serkr "shirt". He compares with the name given to an island or a mountain by Vikings sailing from Norway to Greenland : Hvítserkr cf. Hvitserk, maybe Mount Forel, so Old Saxon *Serki or Old Norse Serkr > Serc could have been a descriptive landmark for Saxon or Scandinavian sailors. In addition Norman toponymy reveals a mixture of (Anglo-)Saxon and Old Norse (Old Danish) place name elements. The Old English form of sark "shirt" (related to Old Norse serkr) is precisely serċ, syrċ > Middle English serk, serke, sark (through the Anglian variant).

History

Early history
In ancient times, Sark was almost certainly occupied by the Unelli, the Gallic tribe of the Cotentin Peninsula. These people were conquered by Julius Caesar of the Roman Empire about 56 BC in the Gallic Wars. About three decades later under Augustus, Gallia Celtica was subdivided into three parts, with this area a part of Gallia Lugdunensis, with its capital in Lugdunum, now Lyon. A later division was named Lugdunensis secunda (Lyonnaise 2nd). A Unelli town, now Coutances, was named Constantia in 298 by the Roman emperor Constantius Chlorus.

Around 430, the bishopric of Coutances (much later under the archbishopric of Rouen), was established in Coutances, having about the same limits as the Lyonnaise 2nd.

In 933, Sark was included in the Duchy of Normandy, based on the traditional boundaries of the Lugdunensis secunda and the archbishopric of Rouen. Following the Norman conquest of England in 1066, the island was united with the Crown of England. In the thirteenth century, the French pirate Eustace the Monk, having served King John, used Sark as a base of operations.

During the Middle Ages, the island was populated by monastic communities. By the 16th century, however, the island was uninhabited and used by pirates as a refuge and base. In 1565, Helier de Carteret, Seigneur of St. Ouen in Jersey, received letters patent from Queen Elizabeth I granting him Sark as a fief in perpetuity on condition that he kept the island free of pirates and occupied by at least forty men who were of her English subjects or swore allegiance to the Crown. This he duly did, leasing 40 parcels of land (known as "Tenements") at a low rent to forty families, mostly from St. Ouen, on condition that a house be built and maintained on each parcel and that "the Tenant" provide one man, armed with a musket, for the defence of the island. The 40 tenements survive to this day, albeit with minor boundary changes. (In 2015, the 450 year anniversary of this event was commemorated with the construction of a modern henge monument, Sark Henge.) A subsequent attempt by the families to endow a constitution under a bailiff, as in Jersey, was stopped by the Guernsey authorities who resented any attempt to wrest Sark from their bailiwick.

Recent history

In 1844, desperate for funds to continue the operation of the silver mine on the island, the incumbent Seigneur, Ernest le Pelley, obtained Crown permission to mortgage Sark's fief to local privateer John Allaire. After the company running the mine went bankrupt, le Pelley was unable to keep up the mortgage payments and, in 1849, his son Pierre Carey le Pelley, the new Seigneur, was forced to sell the fief to Marie Collings for a total of £1,383 (£6,000 less the sum borrowed and an accumulated interest of £616 and 13s).

During World War II, the island, along with the other Channel Islands, was occupied by German forces between 1940 and 1945. German military rule on Sark began on 4 July 1940, the day after the Guernsey Kommandant Major Albrecht Lanz and his interpreter and chief of staff Major Maas visited the island to inform the Dame and Seigneur (Sibyl and Robert Hathaway) of the new regime. British Commandos raided the island several times. Operation Basalt, during the night of 3–4 October 1942, captured a prisoner, and Hardtack 7 was a failed British landing in December 1943. Sark was finally liberated on 10 May 1945, a full day after Guernsey.

In late August 1990, an unemployed French nuclear physicist named André Gardes, armed with a semi-automatic weapon, attempted an invasion of Sark. The night Gardes arrived, he put up two posters declaring his intention to take over the island the following day at noon. The following day he started a solo foot patrol in front of the manor, in battle-dress, weapon in hand. While Gardes was sitting on a bench waiting for noon to arrive, the island's volunteer connétable approached the Frenchman and complimented him on the quality of his weapon. Gardes then proceeded to change the gun's magazine, at which point he was tackled to the ground, arrested, and given a seven-day sentence which he served in Guernsey. Gardes attempted to return the following year, but was intercepted in Guernsey.

Transition to new system of government

Billionaire brothers David and Frederick Barclay had purchased an island within Sark's territorial waters in 1993 along with the hotels on the island. In the mid-1990s, the brothers petitioned the European Court of Human Rights in Strasbourg, France, challenging Sark's inheritance law, which mandated their island be left to David's oldest son. The brothers wanted to will their estate equally to their four children. In 1999, women in Sark were given equal rights of property inheritance, mainly due to the brothers' influence.

Until 2008, Sark's parliament (Chief Pleas) was a single chamber consisting of 54 members, comprising the Seigneur, the Seneschal, 40 owners of the tenements and 12 elected deputies. A change to the system was advocated largely by the Barclay brothers. Their premise was that a change was necessary to comply with the European Convention on Human Rights, though it was suggested that their objection was more likely at odds with certain property tax requirements and primogeniture laws affecting their holdings. The old system was described as feudal and undemocratic because the tenants were entitled to sit in Chief Pleas as of right.

On 16 January 2008 and 21 February 2008, the Chief Pleas approved a law to reform Chief Pleas as a 30-member chamber, with 28 members elected in island-wide elections, one hereditary member (the Seigneur) and one member (the Seneschal) appointed for life. The Privy Council of the United Kingdom approved the Sark law reforms on 9 April 2008. The first elections under the new law were held in December 2008 and the new chamber first convened in January 2009.

Some Sark residents have complained that the new system is not democratic and have described the powers the new law granted to the Seneschal, an unelected member whose term the new law extended to the duration of his natural life, as imperial or dictatorial. The Court of Appeal had ruled his powers to be in breach of the European Convention on Human Rights and his powers were subject to further legal challenges on these grounds.

In 2012 the BBC Today programme reported on local disquiet about the influence on the island of the Barclay brothers. The New Yorker magazine further illustrated the ongoing and escalating tensions between the Barclays and some of the longer-term residents. In 2017 Private Eye also reported on the situation, following the Barclays' decision to close their vineyard and a number of hotels and shops they own on Sark.

Dark Sky Community status
In January 2011, the International Dark-Sky Association designated Sark as Europe's first Dark Sky Community and the first Dark Sky Island in the world. This designation recognises that Sark is sufficiently clear of light pollution to allow naked-eye astronomy. Although Sark was aided in its achievement by its location, its historic ban on cars and the fact that there is no public lighting, it was also necessary for local residents to make adjustments, such as re-siting lights, to cut the light pollution.

The designation was made in January 2011, following an audit by the IDA in 2010. The award is significant in that Sark is the first island community to have achieved this; other Dark-Sky Places have, up to now, been mainly uninhabited areas, and IDA chairman Martin Morgan-Taylor commended Sark residents for their effort. After the designation was granted, Sark Astronomy Society worked to secure funds for an astronomical observatory on the island. In October 2015 Sark's observatory was officially opened by Marek Kukula, public astronomer from the Royal Observatory Greenwich.

Politics

Until the second half of the 2000s Sark was considered the last feudal state in Europe. Together with the other Channel Islands, it is the last remnant of the former Duchy of Normandy still belonging to the Crown. Sark belongs to the Crown in its own right and has an independent relationship with the Crown through the Lieutenant Governor in Guernsey. Formally, the Seigneur holds it as a fief from the Crown, reenfeoffing the landowners on the island with their respective parcels. The political consequences of this construction were abolished in recent years, particularly in the reform of the legislative body, Chief Pleas, which took place in 2008.

Although part of the Bailiwick of Guernsey, Sark is fiscally separate from the rest of the Bailiwick. Together with the islands of Alderney and Guernsey, Sark from time to time approves Bailiwick of Guernsey legislation, which, subject to the approval of all three legislatures, applies in the entire Bailiwick. Legislation cannot be made which applies on Sark without the approval of the Chief Pleas, although recently Chief Pleas has been delegating a number of ordinance-making powers to the States of Guernsey. Such powers are, however, in each case subject to dis-application, or repeal, by the Chief Pleas. By long standing custom, Sark's criminal law has been made by the States of Guernsey, and this custom was put on a statutory basis in Section 4 of the Reform (Sark) Law, 2008, by which Sark delegates criminal law making power to the States of Guernsey.

Sark has its own United Nations Standard Country or Area Code for Statistical Use (680). That code is used for statistical processing purposes by the Statistics Division of the United Nations Secretariat.

The ISO 3166-1 code element  has been exceptionally reserved to refer to Sark. An “exceptionally reserved” code element does not represent a country name in ISO 3166-1, but is reserved for a particular use at the special request of a national ISO member body, government, or international organization (in this case, the United Kingdom). Previously Sark was represented by Guernsey’s country code (GG).

Seigneur

Christopher Beaumont is the current and twenty-third Seigneur of Sark, having inherited the Seigneurie in 2016.

Before the constitutional reforms of 2008, the Seigneur (or Dame in the case of a woman holding the office) was the head of the government of the Isle of Sark. Many of the laws, particularly those related to inheritance and the rule of the Seigneur, had changed little since their promulgation in 1565 under Elizabeth I of England. For example, the Seigneur held the sole right to keep pigeons or an unspayed dog. The latter right was repealed in 2008.

Seneschal
Until 2013 the Seneschal of Sark was the head of the Chief Pleas. From 1583 and 1675 judicial functions were exercised by five elected jurats and a juge, but since 1675 the Seneschal has also been the judge of the island.

The Seneschal was historically appointed by the Seigneur, but nowadays there is an Appointment Committee consisting of the Seigneur and two other members appointed by the Seigneur.

In 2010, following the decision of the English Court of Appeal, the Chief Pleas decided to split the dual role of the Seneschal. Thus, since 2013 the Chief Pleas has elected its own President, who presides in almost all cases. The Seneschal now presides in Chief Pleas only during the election of the President.

The complete list of all the Seneschals of Sark from 1675 is as follows:

 Pierre Gibault (15/7/1675–1680)
 Thomas de Beauvoir (1680–1683)
 Phillipe Dumeresq (1683–1702)
 Jean Payne (1702–1707)
 Philippe de Carteret (1707–1744)
 Henri de Carteret (1744–1752)
 Phillipe le Masurier (1752–1777)
 Henri le Masurier (1777–1785)
 Amice le Couteur (1785–1808)
 Jean le Couteur (1808–1812)
 Jean Falle (1812–1830)
 Elie le Masurier (1830–1841)
 Philippe Guille (1841–1851)
 Thomas Godfray (1851–1876)
 William de Carteret (1876–1881)
 Abraham Baker (1881–1891)
 Thomas Godfray (1891–1920)
 Kenneth Campbell (1920–1922)
 Ashby Taylor (1922–1925)
 Frederick de Carteret (1925–1937)
 William Carré (1937–1945)
 William Baker (1945–1969)
 Bernard Jones (1969–1979)
 Hilary Carré (1979–1985)
 Lawrence Philip de Carteret (1985–2000)
 Reginald J. Guille (2000–2013)
 Jeremy la Trobe-Bateman (2013–2021)
 Bethan Owen (2021-2022)
 Victoria Stamps (2022-present)

Tenants

Pursuant to the royal letters patent, the Seigneur was to keep the island inhabited by at least 40 armed men. Therefore, from his lands, 39 parcels or tenements, each sufficient for one family, were subdivided and granted to settlers, the tenants. Later, some of these parcels were dismembered, and parts of the Seigneurial land were sold, creating more parcels.

Originally each head of a parcel-holding family had the right to vote in Chief Pleas, but in 1604 this right was restricted to the 39 original tenements required by the letters patent, the so-called 'Quarantaine Tenements' (: a group of forty). The newer parcels mostly did not have the obligation to bear arms. In 1611 the dismemberment of tenements was forbidden, but the order was not immediately followed.

In Sark, the word tenant is used (and often pronounced as in French) in the sense of feudal landholder rather than the common English meaning of lessee. Originally, the word referred to any landowner, but today it is mostly used for a holder of one of the  Tenements.

Chief Pleas

Chief Pleas is the parliament of Sark. It consists of eighteen members, elected for a period of office of four years. In addition, the Seigneur and a speaker (who is elected by the ) are counted as members; but they have no right to vote. The periods of office are shifted, with the period of half the  starting in the middle of the periods of the other half. Thus, every second year, nine  are elected for the coming four years. The elections are held on the basis of a single multi-member Sark-wide constituency, with the nine candidates receiving most votes being elected.

However, if there are not more willing candidates than the numbers of positions to fill (including any casual vacancies), then all candidates are declared elected, without any actual election necessary. This happened both in the 2014 and the 2016 elections to the Chief Pleas.

Until 2008, the Chief Pleas consisted of the tenants, and twelve deputies of the people as the only representation of the majority, an office introduced in 1922. The Seigneur and the Seneschal (who presided) were also members of Chief Pleas.

Since 2000, Chief Pleas was working on its own reform, responding to internal and international pressures. On 8 March 2006 by a vote of 25–15 Chief Pleas voted for a new legislature of the Seigneur, the Seneschal, fourteen elected landowners and fourteen elected non-landowners. But it was made plain by the British Lord Chancellor Jack Straw that this option was not on the table.

Offered two options for reform involving an elected legislature, one fully elected, one with a number of seats reserved for elected tenants, 56% of the inhabitants expressed a preference for a totally elected legislature. Following the poll, Chief Pleas voted on 4 October 2006 to replace the twelve deputies and forty tenants in Chief Pleas by 28  elected by universal adult suffrage. This decision was suspended in January 2007 when it was pointed out to Chief Pleas that the 56% versus 44% majority achieved in the opinion poll did not achieve the 60% majority required for the constitutional change. The decision was replaced by the proposal that Chief Pleas should consist of sixteen tenants and twelve  both elected by universal adult suffrage from 2008 to 2012 and that a binding referendum should then decide whether this composition should be kept or replaced by 28 . This proposal was rejected by the Privy Council and the 28  option was reinstated in February 2008 and accepted by Privy Council in April 2008.

In 2003, Chief Pleas voted to vary the long-standing ban on divorce in the island by extending to the Royal Court of Guernsey power to grant divorces.

Bailiwick of Guernsey laws and United Kingdom Acts of Parliament can (the latter as in the case of all the other Channel Islands) be extended to Sark. Normally the consent of Chief Pleas is obtained for this, but the Supreme Court ruled in R v Secretary of State for Justice [2014] UKSC 54 that it need not be. Sark does not make its own criminal laws; the responsibility for making criminal law was assigned to the States of Guernsey by Section 4(3) of the Reform (Sark) Law 2008.

Officers
The executive officers on the island are:

 The Seneschal (Chief Judge, formerly also President of Chief Pleas) and Deputy
 The Prevôt (Sheriff of the Court and of Chief Pleas) and Deputy
 The Greffier (Clerk) and Deputy
 The Treasurer (Finances) and Deputy
 The Connétable (or Constable) is the senior of two police officers and police administrator and the Vingtenier is the junior police officer.

The Seneschal, Prevôt, and Greffier are chosen by the Seigneur, while the Treasurer, Constable and Vingtenier are elected by Chief Pleas.

The list of current Officers of the Island of Sark:
 Seneschal – Victoria Stamps
 Deputy Seneschal – Ash Jarman
 Prevôt – Kevin Adams
 Deputy Prevôt – Joanne Godwin
 Greffier – Trevor John Hamon
 Deputy Greffier – Gary Hamon
 Treasurer – Wendy Kiernan
 Constable – 
 Vingtenier – 
 Speaker of Chief Pleas – Paul Armorgie

Clameur de haro
Among the old laws of the Channel Islands is the old Norman custom of the clameur de haro. Using this legal device, a person can obtain immediate cessation of any action he considers to be an infringement of his rights. At the scene, he must, in front of witnesses, recite the Lord's Prayer in French and cry out "Haro, Haro, Haro! À mon aide mon Prince, on me fait tort!" ("Haro, Haro, Haro! To my aid, my Prince! I am being wronged!"). It should then be registered with the Greffe Office within 24 hours. All actions against the person must then cease until the matter is heard by the Court. The last clameur recorded on Sark was raised in August 2021, this was withdrawn by the claimant in October 2021.

Periodicals
Since 2009 a resident of Sark has operated a weekly online newspaper called The Sark Newspaper (earlier: The Sark Newsletter). The publisher is a former longtime employee of the wealthy Barclay brothers, who own the small neighbouring island of Brecqhou. The publication has compared the local government of Sark "to fascist Germany in the 1930s". In 2014 over 50 residents of Sark filed complaints with the police about accusations made by the paper.

Since 2011 a quarterly magazine called Sark Life, which promotes a positive view of the island and welcomes contributions, is published by the Sark-based publishing company Small Island Publishing.

Sercquiais

Sercquiais (Sarkese, or sometimes called Sark-French) is a dialect of the Norman language still spoken in 1998 by a few older inhabitants of the island. Its decline has been linked with the arrival of English-speaking miners in 1835, and increased tourism in more recent years.

Economy

Tourism
Sark's economy depends primarily on tourism and financial services. Sark has no company registry and relies on Guernsey's financial services commission.

Taxation
Sark is fiscally autonomous from Guernsey, and consequently has control over how it raises taxes. There are no taxes on income, capital gains or inheritances. There is also no VAT charged on goods and services, but import duties (Impôts) are charged on some goods brought onto the island at around 70–75% of Guernsey rates. However, the island does levy a Personal Capital Tax, a Property Tax, a Poll Tax ("Landing Tax") on visitors coming to the island, and a Property Transfer Tax (PTT) on residential properties when they are sold.

The island has its own tax assessor (in 2016, this remained Simon de Carteret), who collects the Property Tax, PTT, and the Personal Capital Tax (direct tax). Currently, the Personal Capital Tax ranges from a minimum of £450, to a maximum of £9,000 or 0.39% per annum (whichever is the lower). In 2014, there were 5 taxpayers who paid the maximum amount of £6,400 (PCT and Property Tax combined), and 6 who paid zero tax. Residents over the age of 69 do not pay the PCT. If a resident chooses not to declare the value of their personal assets, they can elect to pay a flat-rate under the Forfait method.

In 2006, Property Transfer Tax replaced the feudal Treizième. This used to be calculated by dividing the purchase price of any of the 30 tenements or 40 freehold properties on Sark by 13. The proceeds from doing this were then paid directly to the Seigneur. When the Treizième was abolished, the Chief Pleas introduced an indexed-linked pension of £28,000 per year, payable to the Seigneur.

An individual is considered to be a resident for tax purposes if they have remained on the island for at least 90 days in any tax year.

Sark Company Registry
Sark has no public company registry, and no company law. In January 2017, a private organisation called the "Sark Company Registry" was set up. The project was initially opposed by the Guernsey Financial Services Commission, but that opposition ended with nothing, since no law could prohibit private registration of companies. None of managers of the private registry or any company registered by them was ever sanctioned.

Education
Sark generally follows the education system of England though this is not strictly adhered to.

Sark has one school, the Sark School, which takes residents from the ages of 4 to 15. School is divided into 4 classes. Class 1 takes children from the ages of 4 to 7 (reception to year 2), class 2 caters for 7- to 9-year-olds (year 3 to year 4), class 3 has 9- to 14-year-olds (year 5 to year 9) and the older children attend class 4 (years 10 and 11). Pupils wishing to obtain a GCSE or A-level qualification often finish their education in Guernsey or in England. Since 2006, however, a limited number of GCSEs have been offered to pupils at Sark School.

Population

Notes:

 1274 data from census taken before Black Death
 1821–1971 data from 1971 Bailiwick of Guernsey report.
 2008 data represents only eligible voters
 2012 data represents only those who signed for electoral roll. Total is estimated.
 2014 data for Brecqhou from

Demography

Population by gender and movements
Resident population on Sark by gender and residence at one and five-yearly intervals.

Data from the 1971 Bailiwick of Guernsey report.

Population by birthplace and visitors

Data from the 1971 Bailiwick of Guernsey report.

Transport

The Isle of Sark Shipping Company operates small ferries from Sark to St Peter Port, Guernsey. The service takes 55 minutes for the  crossing. A high-speed passenger ferry is operated in summer by the French company Manche Iles Express to Saint Helier, Jersey. A 12-passenger boat, the Lady Maris II, operates regular services to Alderney.

The island is a car-free zone where the only vehicles allowed are horse-drawn vehicles, bicycles, tractors, and battery-powered buggies for elderly or disabled people. Electric bicycles were deregulated in the 2019 Midsummer Chief Pleas with the ordinance coming in to force on 4 July 2019. Passengers and goods arriving by ferry from Guernsey are transported from the wharf by tractor-pulled vehicles.

There is no airport on Sark, and flight over Sark below 2400 ft is prohibited by the Air Navigation (Restriction of Flying) (Guernsey) Regulations 1985 (Guernsey 1985/21). The closest airports are Guernsey Airport and Jersey Airport. Sark lies directly in line of approach to the runway of Guernsey airport, however, and low-flying aircraft regularly fly over the island.

Religion

In common with the other Channel Islands, Sark is attached to the Anglican diocese of Canterbury. Catholics depend on the Roman Catholic Diocese of Portsmouth in England.

Sark has an Anglican church (St Peter's, built 1820) and a Methodist church. John Wesley first proposed a mission to Sark in 1787. Jean de Quetteville of Jersey subsequently began preaching there, initially in a cottage at Le Clos à Geon and then at various houses around Sark. Preachers from Guernsey visited regularly, and in 1796, land was donated by Jean Vaudin, leader of the Methodist community in Sark, for the construction of a chapel, which Jean de Quetteville dedicated in 1797. In the mid-1800s there was a small Plymouth Brethren assembly. Its most notable member was the biblical scholar William Kelly (1821–1906). Kelly was then the tutor to the Seigneur's children.

Supported by the evidence of the names of the tenements of La Moinerie and La Moinerie de Haut, it is believed that the Seigneurie was constructed on the site of the monastery of Saint Magloire. Magloire had been Samson of Dol's successor as bishop of Dol, but retired and founded a monastery in Sark where he died in the late sixth century. According to the vita of Magloire, the monastery housed 62 monks and a school for the instruction of the sons of noble families from the Cotentin. Magloire's relics were venerated at the monastery until the mid-ninth century when Viking raids rendered Sark unsafe, and the monks departed for Jersey, taking the relics with them.

Law enforcement
Despite Sark having its own legislative assembly, Guernsey has sole responsibility for matters of criminal law under the Sark (Reform) Law 2008. For matters of extreme law enforcement the island calls upon the States of Guernsey Police Service. Sark has a small police station and jail, with two (rarely used) cells available. The island has several police officers permanently stationed on it, the constable (senior officer), the vingtenier (deputy constable), two assistant constables (former constables), two custody officers (special constables) and several special constables. Sark also has access to police services in Guernsey through the designation of a member of the Guernsey Neighbourhood Policing Team as a dedicated point of contact for Sark constables.

Emergency services

A resident doctor provides healthcare on Sark, and is available to attend accidents and emergencies. The Sark Ambulance Service operates two tractor-drawn ambulances, and is able to treat casualties and transport them to the harbour for transfer onto the Guernsey marine ambulance launch, Flying Christine III, operated by Guernsey Ambulance and Rescue Service. A small ambulance station houses the two ambulances.

Fire and rescue services are provided by an independent and volunteer service established in 1958. Originally named 'Sark Fire Brigade', it is now known as the Sark Fire and Rescue Service. The services operates two pump tenders and an all-purpose trailer; all three appliances are drawn by tractors owing to the ban on other motor vehicles on Sark. The original fire station was a large garage. Today the service operates from a large purpose-built fire station on La Chasse Marette.

Lifeboat services are provided by the Royal National Lifeboat Institution from the Guernsey lifeboat station, supported by the RNLI stations on Jersey and Alderney.

Sport

Participation in sport tends towards individual sports rather than team sports, but the population supports a cricket team, a rugby union team and a football team. Sark competes in the biennial Island Games in which the Sark football team has participated. The annual Sark to Jersey Rowing Race is contested by teams from both bailiwicks. Carl Hester, who was brought up in Sark, won a gold medal at the 2012 Summer Olympics in the Individual and Team Dressage events. A Sark post box was painted gold to celebrate the event.

Sark in media
There are many examples of media taking Sark as an inspiration or setting.

Norman literature
Although there is no record of literature about Sark in Sercquiais, Guernésiais and Jèrriais literature has included writing about Sark; for example by such authors as Edwin John Luce, Thomas Grut, George F. Le Feuvre, and Denys Corbet.

English literature
 Algernon Swinburne wrote a poem, In Sark, which appears in the collection A Century of Roundels.
 Arthur Conan Doyle's Sir Nigel (1906) includes a sub-plot where Black Simon of Norwich, a man at arms travelling with Sir Nigel Loring to war, obtains permission from Sir Robert Knolles to go ashore to Sark under cover of darkness. He takes his friend the archer Samkin Alward with him and beheads the (so-called) King of Sark in payment of a wager.
 John Oxenham wrote Carette of Sark (1907) and The Perilous Lovers (1924), historical novels largely set on Sark. His 1910 novel A Maid of the Silver Sea uses the mines of Little Sark as its setting.
 The novel Mr Pye, by Mervyn Peake, is set on Sark. The book has been adapted for radio and television. The TV series, filmed on Sark, starred Derek Jacobi and Judy Parfitt, and featured a number of islanders. Peake lived on the island for several years as a painter before he began writing. The setting of his best known novels, the Gormenghast series, may have been inspired by Sark.
 Dame of Sark, the memoirs of the 21st Seigneur Sibyl Mary Hathaway, who was present during the German occupation, were made into a play and television drama of the same name. Dame Sibyl also wrote Maid of Sark, an historical romance published in 1939; set in the sixteenth century, it incorporates events related to the defence of the island against the Bretons.
 The novel Appointment with Venus by Jerrard Tickell is set on the fictional island of Armorel, which is presumed to be based on Sark. The 1951 film of the book used Sark as a principal location.
 Sarah Caudwell's The Sirens Sang of Murder (1989) is partly set in Sark, and contains references to John Oxenham's The Perilous Lovers.
The Last Kings of Sark: A Novel by Rosa Rankin-Gee is a 2015 coming-of-age story set in Sark. 
 The 2016 novel Iron Chamber of Memory by John C. Wright is set in Sark.
 The 2018 novel Dark Sky Island by Lara Dearman is set in Sark.

French literature 
Maurice Leblanc's novel L'Île aux Trente Cercueils (translated in English as The Secret of Sarek) features an island called Sarek, off the coast of Brittany, and bears obvious similarities to Sark. In the story, gentleman-thief Arsène Lupin rescues Véronique d'Hergemont from a local superstition requiring the death of thirty women to appease vengeful spirits.

In music
Irish musician, composer and singer Enya's 2015 album Dark Sky Island was inspired by Sark's designation as the first 'dark sky island'. Certain songs on the album, the title track especially, explore the stars, skies and nature.

Television

 The 1986 television adaptation of Mr Pye by Mervyn Peake and starring Derek Jacobi was filmed on the island. The original novel is also set on Sark.
 Sark featured in the 6th episode of the fourth series of The New Statesman, The Irresistible Rise of Alan B'Stard.
 Part of the seventh episode of the second series of World War II television drama Enemy at the Door takes place in Sark. La Coupée features in a number of scenes.
 Sark, and in particular the Gouliot Caves, features in episode 8 of series 3 of the BBC television series Coast.
 Sark was featured in Episode 3 of the 2009 ITV television series Islands of Britain, presented by Martin Clunes.
 Series 7 and 8 of the BBC Two six-episode television series An Island Parish follows the Anglican priest and Methodist minister on Sark. It was first broadcast in 2013 and 2014.
 One of the episodes of Bergerac called "Burnt", was mostly filmed on Sark. Bergerac was a Jersey-based BBC and Australia's Seven Network detective drama starring John Nettles and was filmed between 1981 and 1991. It featured a fight on and over the edge of La Coupée.
 Sark and its football team featured as a topic in series 7 episode 2 of the web series Citation Needed, hosted by YouTuber Tom Scott.

See also
 Seigneur of Sark
 Archaeology of the Channel Islands

References

Notes

Citations

Further reading

External links

 Government of Sark webpage
 
 St Peter's Sark
 

 
Geography of the Channel Islands
Parishes of the Channel Islands
Car-free zones in Europe
Dark-sky preserves
Islands of the Channel Islands
Road-inaccessible communities of Europe